Kulaura Junction railway station is a junction station situated in Kulaura Upazila of Moulvibazar District in Bangladesh. It was opened in 1910 on Kulaura–Shahbajpur line. Then it became a junction station when Kulaura–Sylhet line railway was opened in 1912–15.

History
In response to the demands of the Assam tea planters for a railway link to Chittagong port, Assam Bengal Railway started construction of a railway track on the eastern side of Bengal in 1891. A  track between Chittagong and Comilla was opened to traffic in 1895. The Comilla–Akhaura–Kulaura–Badarpur section was opened in 1896–98 and extended to Lumding by 1903.

The Kulaura-Sylhet section was opened 1912–15, the Shaistaganj-Habiganj branch line in 1928, the Shaistaganj–Balla branch line in 1929 and the Sylhet–Chhatak Bazar line in 1954.

A metre gauge link exists between Shahbajpur in Bangladesh and Mahisasan in India.

References

Railway stations opened in 1910
Railway junction stations in Bangladesh
Railway stations in Sylhet Division